"iMali" is a single by South African DJ Karyendasoul and Zakes Bantwini featuring South African singer Nana Atta, released on October 22, 2021 through Universal Music as EP's lead single. It was produced by Bonga Ntozini and Zakhele Madida.

The song debuted number one in South Africa. It was certified platinum by the Recording industry of South Africa (RiSA).

Commercial performance 
The song topped number one in South Africa on both Gagasi FM top 30 and Metro FM top 40.

"iMali" was certified platinum in South Africa.

Awards and nominations 
"iMali" was nominated for Best Collaboration at 28th South African Music Awards. 

!
|-
|2022
|"iMali"
|Best Collaboration
|
|

Certifications and sales

Track listing
Digital download and streaming
 "iMali"  – 7:16

Personnel 
All credits for "iMali" are adapted from AllMusic.
 Nana Atta - Primary Artist, Vocals
 Zakes Bantwini - Musical Producer, Primary Artist
 Karyendasoul - Musical Producer, Primary Artist
 Zakhele Madida - Composer
 Bonga Ntozini - Producer

References 

2021 songs